Saint Geremarus (or Germer, Geremar, Geremaro; died 658) was a Frankish monk and abbot.
His feast day is 24 September.

Life

The oldest surviving biography of Saint Geremarus was composed in the 9th century, and was revised three centuries later, so its historical accuracy is very dubious.
He held high positions in the courts of the Merovingian kings Dagobert I (r. 629–639) and Clovis II (r. 639–657).
He had two daughters and a son who died in infancy.

Geremarus met Audoin at Dagobert's court, and on his advice founded the Isle-sur-Epte Abbey (now Saint-Pierre-Bois).
Audoin later ordained him as a priest.
Again on Audoin's advice he founded a new monastery in Fly, now Saint-Germer-de-Fly Abbey.
He died about three years afterwards.

Monks of Ramsgate account

The monks of St Augustine's Abbey, Ramsgate wrote in their Book of Saints (1921),

Butler's account

The hagiographer Alban Butler (1710–1773) wrote in his Lives of the Fathers, Martyrs, and Other Principal Saints under September 24,

Notes

Sources

 

 

7th-century Frankish saints
658 deaths
608 births